Richard Stanford Cox (April 19, 1930 – July 8, 1994), known professionally as Dick Sargent, was an American actor, notable as the second actor to portray Darrin Stephens on ABC's fantasy situation comedy Bewitched. He took the name Dick Sargent from a Saturday Evening Post illustrator/artist of the same name.

Early life and career
Sargent was born Richard Stanford Cox in Carmel-by-the-Sea, California, on April 19, 1930, to Ruth McNaughton and Colonel Elmer Cox. Ruth McNaughton was daughter of John McNaughton (who founded Los Angeles's famed Union Stockyards). She appeared under the stage name of Ruth Powell, and had supporting bit roles in such films as The Four Horsemen of the Apocalypse and Hearts and Trumps with Nazimova. Sargent's father Colonel Elmer Cox served in World War I and later became a business manager to Hollywood figures, including Douglas Fairbanks and Erich von Stroheim. Sargent attended the San Rafael Military Academy in San Rafael, California, before majoring in drama at Stanford University. He appeared in two dozen plays with the Stanford Players Theater.

Sargent appeared in feature films following his debut in Prisoner of War (1954). He appeared in The Great Locomotive Chase (1956) starring Fess Parker. In the 1957 movie Bernardine, the little-known Sargent had his most important role to date, as lovesick teenager Sanford "Fofo" Wilson. The character was the main focus of the story, but Sargent's work was overshadowed by the presence of several famous names in the cast, including Hollywood legend Janet Gaynor, sitcom star Ronnie Burns, and Pat Boone, who had just become a singing sensation and was making his film debut.

Sargent appeared in the 1959 feature film Operation Petticoat starring Cary Grant, and The Ghost and Mr. Chicken starring Don Knotts in 1966. He was a regular in three short-lived television comedies, One Happy Family in 1961, Broadside  in 1964, and The Tammy Grimes Show, a four-episode ABC flop in 1966. For three seasons, from 1969 to 1972, he played Darrin Stephens in Bewitched, replacing ailing actor Dick York, a role he had previously turned down.

In 1975, Sargent appeared on the television show TattleTales with Fannie Flagg as his "beard", and was introduced as "her guy".

His later movies included the crime drama Hardcore (1979) as Jake Van Dorn's strait-laced brother-in-law, Wes DeJong, and as Dr. Jameson in the sci-fi horror film Parts: The Clonus Horror (1979). He also played Sheriff Grady Byrd in two 1979–1980 season episodes of The Dukes of Hazzard.

Sargent continued to work in film. He played Harry in Live a Little, Love a Little (1968) opposite Elvis Presley and Michele Carey, and made guest appearances on television series, including Navy Log, The West Point Story, Medic, Code 3, Ripcord, Gunsmoke, Wagon Train, The Alaskans, The Adventures of Ozzie and Harriet, The Rat Patrol, I Dream of Jeannie, Hazel, Dr. Kildare, Daniel Boone, Kraft Mystery Theater, Three's Company, The Waltons, Charlie's Angels, Knots Landing, Family Ties, The Love Boat, Fantasy Island, Adam-12, The Streets of San Francisco, Owen Marshall: Counselor at Law, Ellery Queen, The Tony Randall Show, The Devlin Connection, Baretta, Switch, The Six Million Dollar Man, Marcus Welby, M.D., Trapper John, M.D., Matt Houston, Alice, Taxi, Benson, Vega$, Diff'rent Strokes, Here's Lucy, Love, American Style, The Yellow Rose, The Commish, Finder of Lost Loves, Murder, She Wrote, L.A. Law and Harry and the Hendersons. In 1990, he also portrayed himself in an episode of Columbo. In the mid-1980s he landed the steady role of Richard Preston, the widowed father, in the TBS sitcom Down to Earth. He also appeared in the fantasy comedy Teen Witch (1989).

Throughout the 1980s, he joined actress Sally Struthers as an advocate for Christian Children's Fund, which brought relief to children in developing nations. Sargent also did charitable work for the Special Olympics, World Hunger, AIDS Project Los Angeles and the American Foundation for AIDS Research.

Personal life
On National Coming Out Day in 1991, Sargent publicly declared his homosexuality and supported gay rights issues. The high rate of suicide among young gay people was the main reason; he jokingly referred to himself as a "retroactive role model". Sargent recognized that his ill health from prostate cancer may have led people to assume he suffered from AIDS.

Sargent had a companion with whom he lived for over 20 years, before the unidentified man died from a cerebral hemorrhage in 1979. He later lived with his domestic partner, Albert Williams, until his death.

In June 1992, Sargent was a Grand Marshal of the Los Angeles Gay Pride parade along with Elizabeth Montgomery.

Death
Sargent was diagnosed with prostate cancer in 1989. Doctors were initially optimistic that it could be treated. However, the disease continued to spread and, by early 1994, he had become seriously ill. Sargent died from the disease on July 8, 1994, aged 64. His body was cremated.

Former Bewitched co-star Elizabeth Montgomery commented, "He was a great friend, and I will miss his love, his sense of humor and his remarkable courage." Montgomery herself died of colon cancer less than a year later.

Partial filmography

Prisoner of War (1954) – Lt. Leonard Lee (uncredited)
The Beast with a Million Eyes (1955) – Deputy Larry Brewster
The Great Locomotive Chase (1956) – Union Soldier (uncredited)
Love Me Tender (1956) – Confederate Soldier (uncredited)
Bernardine (1957) – Sanford Wilson
Mardi Gras (1958) – Dick Saglon
Operation Petticoat (1959) – Ens. Stovall
The Great Impostor (1960) – Hotchkiss
That Touch of Mink (1962) – Young Man (Harry Clark)
For Love or Money (1963) – Harvey Wofford
Captain Newman, M.D. (1963) – Lt. Belden 'Barney' Alderson
Fluffy (1965) – Tommy
Billie (1965) – Matt Bullitt
The Ghost and Mr. Chicken (1966) – George Beckett
The Private Navy of Sgt. O'Farrell (1968) – Capt. Elwood Prohaska
Daniel Boone - Reuben Stone - S2/E18 "The Deserter" (1966)
The Young Runaways (1968) – Freddy 'Sage'
Live a Little, Love a Little (1968)
 I Dream of Jeannie (1969) one episode, Jeannie for the Defense - Norman Cashman
Adam-12 (1969) Log 92, Tell him he pushed a little too hard – Harry
Bewitched (1969-1972) three seasons - Darrin Stephens
Here's Lucy (1973) one episode, Lucy Plays Cops and Robbers
 The Streets of San Francisco (1973) one episode, Season 1, episode 25, Shattered Image
The Love Boat (1977) one episode, Lonely at the Top/Silent Night/Divorce Me – Father Mike
Three's Company (1977) – Lloyd Cross
Charlie’s Angels (1978) – one episode, Angels in Vegas - Marty Cole
Hardcore (1979) – Wes DeJong
Parts: The Clonus Horror (1979) – Dr. Jameson
’’Family Ties’’ (1982) one episode, No Nukes Is Good Nukes - Elyse's dad
I'm Going to Be Famous (1983) – The Director
Benson (1984) season 6 episode 4 "the campaign" as Worth Lakewood
The Eleventh Commandment (1986) – Charles Knight
Teen Witch (1989) – Frank Miller
Rock-A-Die Baby (1989) – Dad (Adam)
Twenty Dollar Star (1990) – Mr. Brandon
Murder by Numbers (1990) – Patrick Crain
Frame Up (1991) – Will Curran
Acting on Impulse (1993) – Mr. Randolph (final film role)

References

Further reading

External links

 
 
 

1930 births
1994 deaths
20th-century American male actors
Male actors from California
American male film actors
American male television actors
Deaths from cancer in California
Deaths from prostate cancer
American gay actors
American LGBT rights activists
LGBT people from California
People from Carmel-by-the-Sea, California
Activists from California
Bewitched
20th-century American LGBT people